A by-election was held in the Cook Islands electorate of Manihiki (electorate) on 5 May 2021. The by-election was triggered by the resignation of former Prime Minister Henry Puna in order to take up the job of Secretary General of the Pacific Islands Forum.

The Cook Islands Party and Democratic Party have not yet announced candidates. On 7 April 2021 businessman Temu Okotai announced that he would contest the election as an independent. On 8 April the Democrats announced Munokoa Maraeara as their candidate. On 13 April the Cook Islands Party announced Akaiti Puna, wife of former MP Henry Puna, as their candidate.

The election was won by Akaiti Puna.

References

By-elections in the Cook Islands
Manihiki
2021 in the Cook Islands
Manihiki